Rothschild's bird-of-paradise  is a bird in the family Paradisaeidae that is a hybrid between a raggiana bird-of-paradise and lesser bird-of-paradise.  It was named after British ornithologist Walter Rothschild.

History
At least four adult male specimens of this hybrid are known, and are held in the American Museum of Natural History, the British Natural History Museum and the Australian Museum.  Although localities are lacking for three of them, one comes from 110 km south of Madang in north-eastern New Guinea.

Notes

References
 
 

Paradisaea
Hybrid birds of paradise
Birds of New Guinea
Taxa named by Walter Rothschild